Nueva Era is the 13th album by the Mexican pop singer Yuri. It was released on October 19, 1993.

Track listing

Production
 Producer and director: Alejandro Zepeda
 Production coordinator: Fernando Figueroa
 Recording engineer: Daren J. Klein
 Rhythm arrangements: Alejandro Zepeda and Aaron Zigman
 Horn arrangements: Jerry Hey, Gary Grant, Aaron Zigman, Alex Zepeda
 String arrangements: Aaron Zigman and Alex Zepeda
 Keyboards: David Garfield, Robert Palmer, Aaron Zigman, Randy Kerber, Carlos Murguía, Alex Zepeda
 Additional keyboards: Jerry Knight, Aaron Zigman and Alex Zepeda
 Bass: Neil Stubenhaus, Aaron Zigman, Jerry Knight, Randy Kerber, and Alex Zepeda
 Guitars: Michael Landau, David Williams and Jerry Knight
 Drums: Alejandro Zepeda
 Percussion: Michael Fisher and Alejandro Zepeda
 Brass section: Jerry Hey, Gary Grant, Bill Reikhenbach and Dave "Rev" Boruff
 Trumpet: Gary Grant
 Saxophone: Dave "Rev" Boruff
 Background vocals: Kenny O'Bryan, Jerry Knight, Daniel Indart and Alex Zepeda
 Programming: Alejandro Zepeda, Erick Hanson, Gary Grant, Randy Kerber Robert Palmer, Aaron Zigman
 Recording studios: Conway Studios, Sunset Sound, Westlake Audio, Pacifique Recording Studios, Corner Stone Recorders, Risk Sound Studios and Zigzoo Animal Sound
 Auxiliary engineers: Gil Morales, Ken Deranteriasian, Bryan Carrigan and Rich Hasal
 Mixing engineer: Daren J. Klein
 Production assistant: Camille Henrry
 Production coordination: Aaron Zigman, Diana Tello and Alex Zepeda
 Additional equipment: Design FX, Drum Doctors, West Audio FX, STS Rentals
 Mastering: Tower Mastering (Capitol) by Wally Traugott
 Photographer: Enrique Badulescu
 Art director: Arturo Medellín
 Graphic design: Rocio Larrazolo
 Scanning: D.G. Jorge Ruiz
 Make-up: White Paco

Singles
 Detrás de mi ventana
 Yo sé
 Amiga mia
 Si falta el amor
 Celia Mix (Bemba colora/El yerbero moderno/Quimbara)

Single charts

References

1993 albums
Yuri (Mexican singer) albums